In 2008 the Gulf Volleyball Clubs Champions Championship was won by the Al-Qadsia team.

League standings

References

Source: koora.com (Arabic)

GCC Volleyball Club Championship